The Toledo Academy of Beauty is a nationally accredited cosmetology school located in Toledo, Ohio. The school is not affiliated with one product or company. There are two programs available: students may take classes specializing in Esthetics or Manicuring. 

Toledo Academy of Beauty is a member of the Chamber of Commerce and the Better Business Bureau of Toledo. The school approved by the Ohio State Board of Education, accredited by the National Accrediting Commission of Cosmetology Arts & Sciences (NACCAS), and licensed by the Ohio State Board of Cosmetology.

References

External links
Toledo Academy of Beauty

Vocational schools in Ohio
Hairdressing
Education in Toledo, Ohio